Orahovica is a town in Slavonia, Croatia.  It is situated on the slopes of the mountain Papuk and positioned on the state road D2 Varaždin-Koprivnica-Našice-Osijek.

History

The name Orahovica is derived from the word orah, meaning a walnut tree.

Orahovica was first officially mentioned in the year 1228, in a historical document issued by king Andrew II. Ružica fortification, not far from Orahovica, was first mentioned in the year 1357 as a royal estate. In the 15th and the first half of the 16th century the town was a thriving community owned by various patricians (Nikola Kont, Lovro Iločki, Ladislav Iločki, Ladislav More etc.)

Suleiman I, in his 1542 campaign, conquered Orahovica. It was renamed as "Rahoviçe" and initially was kaza centre in Sanjak of Pojega, which initially part of Budin Eyalet (1542-1580), later in Bosna Eyalet (1580-1600) and finally in Kanije Eyalet. It became a notable sanjak centre in Kanije Eyalet in 1601. The Turkish rule lasted till the year 1687. After the liberation, and up until the end of the 19th century many prominent noble families, like the Pejačević family, and the Mihalović family, owned the town.

In the late 19th century and early 20th century, Orahovica was part of the Virovitica County of the Kingdom of Croatia-Slavonia.

In the 20th century the town was a centre of a large municipality with a well-developed industry, and agriculture.

During the Croatian War of Independence Orahovica suffered from a number of shell attacks that caused certain material damage.

It received the status of a town in 1997.

Economy

Orahovica has a developed industry of tile production, panel-parquet, wine production, fruit and vegetables processing, and metal processing. Agriculture plays an important role for the town economy (crop and livestock farming, fresh water fish, fruit and vineyards).

Population

In the 2011 census, the total population of the administrative area of Orahovica was 5,304, distributed in the following settlements:

 Bijeljevina Orahovička, population 37
 Crkvari, population 128
 Dolci, population 286
 Donja Pištana, population 239
 Duzluk, population 163
 Gornja Pištana, population 5
 Karlovac Feričanački, population 12
 Kokočak, population 14
 Magadinovac, population 11
 Nova Jošava, population 182
 Orahovica, population 3,954
 Stara Jošava, population 240
 Šumeđe, population 33

In 2011, 87% of the population were Croats.

 Source: CD-rom: "Naselja i stanovništvo RH od 1857-2001. godine", Izdanje Državnog zavoda za statistiku Republike Hrvatske, Zagreb, 2005.

Notable sights

 Orahovica's Lake - the most popular destination every summer.
 Locomotive "Ćiro" - in the middle of the town
 Ružica grad - old ruins of the fortress near the lake
 Orahovica Monastery - Serbian Orthodox monastery
 Watermill - in the city park

Education

 Kindergarten "Palčić"
 Primary school "I.B. - Mažuranić"
 High School "Stjepan Ivšić"

Tourism

Orahovica became one of the most popular tourist destinations in Virovitica-Podravina County and Slavonia. Its culture, events, beautiful nature, sports and lake attract more and more tourists every year. The Spring of Orahovica, an annual cultural and tourist festival, is held since 1957.

Notable natives and residents
Robert Domany
Gojko Zec
Stjepan Mesić

References

External links

 Local Radio station: www.radio-orahovica.hr
 Keramika Modus Ltd: / www.keramika-modus.com
 Eurovoće: www.eurovoce.hr
 Local basketball club: www.kk-orahovica.hr
 Nature park Papuk: www.pp-papuk.hr

Cities and towns in Croatia
Slavonia
Populated places in Virovitica-Podravina County